= S+ (TV channel) =

Portuguese television channel

- Country: Portugal
- Broadcast area: Portugal
- Headquarters: Lisbon

Programming
- Language: Portuguese
- Picture format: 720p (HDTV)

Ownership
- Owner: Mediapro Portugal

History
- Launched: 30 April 2018

S+ is a Portuguese television channel owned by Mediapro that specializes in health and wellbeing programming. The channel is owned by Canalife, a Mediapro Portugal company, and airs content of its own production, and formerly, acquired content. The channel is headquartered in Lisbon, with its studios located at Venda do Pinheiro, with an additional operational office in Porto, at Centro de Inovação de Matosinhos.

== History ==
S+ was announced on April 18, 2018, with a €2 million investment and an initial exclusivity deal with NOS, as well as an April 30 launch. The channel at launch time had a staff of 30 and plans to become among the five most-watched cable channels by 2021. Launch formats included Com Todo o Gosto (cooking), Anatomia de Vénus (sex), Move It (physical training), Tenho um Bebé, E Agora? (parenting) and Pura Vida (stories of people who survived severe disease).

On May 2, 2019, coinciding with its first anniversary, the channel launched on MEO.

Its primary advertiser in 2022 was insurance company Fidelidade, which was responsible for 68,83% of Canalife's revenue in that year alone.
